Films dealing with blues history or prominently featuring blues music as a theme include:
St. Louis Blues (1929): the only short movie with Bessie Smith
Blues in the Night (1941)
Two Girls and a Sailor (1944)
A Face in the Crowd (1957)
Sounder (1972)
Lady Sings The Blues  (1972): about Billie Holiday
Leadbelly (1976): biographical film about Huddie William Ledbetter
The Blues Brothers (1980)
Streets of Fire  (1984)
Crossroads (1986): directed by Walter Hill, about a "deal with the devil", with a soundtrack by Ry Cooder and a guitar duel between Ralph Macchio and Steve Vai
 Mo' Better Blues (1990)
The Search for Robert Johnson (1991): documentary aiming to discover facts and myths about the infamous blues guitarist
Blues Brothers 2000 (1998)
O Brother, Where Art Thou? (2000)
Ghost World (2001)
Deep Blues: A Musical Pilgrimage to the Crossroads (2003)
Last of the Mississippi Jukes (2003)
The Blues, a Musical Journey (2003): Martin Scorsese produced seven documentaries about the blues:
Feel Like Going Home (Martin Scorsese): about the African origins of the blues
The Soul of a Man (Wim Wenders): about Skip James, Blind Willie Johnson and J. B. Lenoir 
The Road to Memphis (Richard Pearce) : focuses on B. B. King's contributions 
Warming by the Devil's Fire (Charles Burnett): fiction on a blues-based theme
Godfathers and Sons (Marc Levin): about Chicago blues and hip-hop
Red, White & Blues (Mike Figgis): about British blues-influenced music (e.g., Tom Jones, Van Morrison) 
Piano Blues (Clint Eastwood): focuses on blues pianists such as Ray Charles and Dr. John
Ray (2004)
Richard Johnston: Hill Country Troubadour (2005): Max Shores documentary about R. L. Burnside, Jessie Mae Hemphill, Junior Kimbrough, Richard Johnston, and other north Mississippi hill country blues musicians
You See Me Laughin' (2005): directed by Mandy Stein, documentary that takes a look at the often untamed lifestyles of the last great North Mississippi bluesmen and the Oxford, Mississippi–based label (Fat Possum Records) that struggles to record them
Black Snake Moan (2007)
Honeydripper (2007)
Cadillac Records (2008) 
Who Do You Love? (2008)

References

Blues
 
Music-related lists